Afonso II (English: Alphonzo; Archaic Portuguese: Affonso; Portuguese-Galician: Alfonso or Alphonso; Latin: Alphonsus; 23 April 118525 March 1223), nicknamed the Fat (o Gordo) or the Leper (o Gafo), was the third king of Portugal and the second but eldest surviving son of Sancho I of Portugal and Dulce of Aragon. Afonso succeeded his father on 27 March 1211.

Reign

As a king, Afonso II set a different approach of government. Hitherto, his father Sancho I and his grandfather Afonso I were mostly concerned with military issues either against the neighbouring Kingdom of Castile or against the Moorish lands in the south. Afonso did not pursue territory enlargement policies and managed to ensure peace with Castile during his reign. Despite this, some towns were conquered from the Moors by the private initiative of noblemen and clergy, as when Bishop Soeiro Viegas initiated the conquest of Alcácer do Sal. This does not mean that he was a weak or somehow cowardly man. The first years of his reign were marked instead by internal disturbances between Afonso and his brothers and sisters. The king managed to keep security within Portuguese borders only by outlawing and exiling his kin.

Since military issues were not a government priority, Afonso established the state's administration and centralized power on himself. He designed the first set of Portuguese written laws. These were mainly concerned with private property, civil justice, and minting. Afonso also sent ambassadors to European kingdoms outside the Iberian Peninsula and began amicable commercial relations with most of them.

Other reforms included the always delicate matters with the pope. In order to get the independence of Portugal recognized by Rome, his grandfather, Afonso I, had to legislate an enormous number of privileges to the Church. These eventually created a state within the state. With Portugal's position as a country firmly established, Afonso II endeavoured to weaken the power of the clergy and to apply a portion of the enormous revenues of the Catholic Church to purposes of national utility. These actions led to a serious diplomatic conflict between the pope and Portugal. After being excommunicated for his audacities by Pope Honorius III, Afonso II promised to make amends to the church, but he died in Coimbra on 25 March 1223 before making any serious attempts to do so.

King Afonso was buried originally at the Monastery of Santa Cruz in Coimbra where his body remained for nearly ten years. His remains were transferred subsequently to Alcobaça Monastery, as he had stipulated in his will. He and his wife, Queen Urraca, were buried at its Royal Pantheon.

Marriage and descendants
In 1206, he married Urraca, daughter of Alfonso VIII of Castile and Eleanor of England. The couple were both descendants of King Alfonso VI of León. The offspring of this marriage were:

 Sancho II (8 September 12074 January 1248), king of Portugal; 
 Afonso III (5 May 121016 February 1279), king of Portugal;
 Eleanor (1211–1231), queen of Denmark
 Ferdinand (1218–1246), lord of Serpa

Out of wedlock, he had two illegitimate sons:
 João Afonso (d. 9 October 1234), buried in the Alcobaça monastery;
 Pedro Afonso (d. after 1249), who accompanied his brother King Afonso in the conquest of Faro in 1249. He had an illegitimate daughter named Constança Peres.

Ancestry

References

Bibliography

 
 
 

Portuguese infantes
House of Burgundy-Portugal
People excommunicated by the Catholic Church
1185 births
1223 deaths
People of the Reconquista
People from Coimbra
12th-century Portuguese people
13th-century Portuguese monarchs